Mubarak Mandi is a palace in Jammu, India. The palace was the royal residence of the maharaja of Jammu and Kashmir from the Dogra dynasty. It was their main seat till 1925 when maharaja Hari Singh moved to the Hari Niwas Palace in the northern part of Jammu. The palace is located in the heart of the old walled city of Jammu and overlooks the Tawi river.

History
In medieval times, Raja Maldev founded Jammu after Tamerlane destroyed his city at Babor near Lake Mansar. He choose Mubarak Mandi as his residence. Successive generations built palaces and extended it to its zenith. The oldest building of the complex dates back to 1824. Successive maharajas added to the complex in size and building took more than 150 years. The architecture is a mix of Rajasthani architecture and European baroque, and Mughal styles.

The complex is grouped around several courtyards and includes various buildings and palaces like the Darbar Hall Complex, the Pink Palace, Royal Courts buildings, Gol Ghar Complex, Nawa Mahal, Rani Charak Palace, Hawa Mahal, the Toshakhana palace and the Sheesh Mahal. The halls and galleries of the palace were used for official functions and ceremonies.

Nowadays sections of the palace house government offices, courts and the Dogra Art Museum. However, other parts of the palace are in ruins as the palace has more than 36 times has been the victim of fires. Furthermore, the building suffered from earthquakes in the 1980s and in 2005.

The Dogra art museum is situated within the ‘Pink Hall’. It has a rich collection containing miniature paintings of various styles of the region. The miniatures belong to the Kangra, Jammu and the Basholi art schools. But it also has a gold painted bow and arrow of Mughal emperor Shah Jahan. The pink hall owes its name to the pink plastered walls of the palace section.

The Gol Ghar section is located in the southern part of the complex. It has four storeys and overlooks the Tawi river. It has been gutted down in the mid-1980s as a result of an earthquake. Consequently, roofs and floors collapsed, leaving the building as a ruin.

The Sheesh Mahal is made entirely of glass.

The palace, which is a heritage site declared by the state government, is proposed to be linked with a rope way running up to the Bahu Fort, another heritage site in the city.

Bibliography
 Poonam Chaudhary, and Jasbir Singh Katoch: 'Mubarak Mandi Palace - Inheritance Of An Ailing Heritage. Jammu', Jammu: Saksham Books International 2008.

External links 
 Forum post about the Mubarak Mandi palace
 Website from a conservation enterprise working at the Mubarak Mandi
 Website from Jammu city on local sights
 Article on Mubarak Mandi Palace

Royal residences in India
Tourist attractions in Jammu (city)
Palaces in Jammu and Kashmir
1824 establishments in India
Jammu and Kashmir (princely state)
Rajput architecture
Buildings and structures in Jammu (city)
19th-century establishments in Jammu and Kashmir